Danny Ferguson (5 February 1939 – 1977) was a Scottish footballer, who played for Hamilton, Hearts, Durban United, Morton and Cowdenbeath.

Popular Culture 

Ferguson appeared as a contestant on the popular American game show What's My Line, on June 14, 1964.

References

External links 

1939 births
1977 deaths
People from Prestonpans
Association football fullbacks
Scottish footballers
Hamilton Academical F.C. players
Heart of Midlothian F.C. players
Greenock Morton F.C. players
Cowdenbeath F.C. players
Scottish Football League players
Scottish expatriate footballers
Expatriate soccer players in South Africa
Footballers from East Lothian
Date of death missing
Place of death missing
Durban United F.C. players
Scottish expatriate sportspeople in South Africa
Ormiston F.C. players